Cristina Pizarro Mingo (born 20 November 1989), also known as Chini, is a Spanish footballer who plays as a defender for Primera División club Sporting Huelva. She previously played for Atlético Madrid,  Rayo Vallecano and Real Sociedad.

Early life

Pizarro earned the nickname 'Chini' because there were two people called Cristina in her football team growing up. The nickname arose because her eyes resembled those of Chinese people. Due to the limited availability of footballs during her childhood, she often played football with bottles, juice cartons or a ball of paper.

Career

She is the first non-Basque player to play for Real Sociedad. Following signing for Logroño in 2019, she provided an assist on her debut. In 2020, she renewed her contract with Logroño. In July 2021, she signed for Sporting Huelva, becoming their fifth signing of the summer.

Titles
 2 leagues: 2010, 2011
1 Queen's Cup: 2019

References

External links
 

1989 births
Living people
Spanish women's footballers
Primera División (women) players
Rayo Vallecano Femenino players
Atlético Madrid Femenino players
Footballers from the Community of Madrid
Real Sociedad (women) players
Women's association football defenders
EdF Logroño players
Sporting de Huelva players
CE Sant Gabriel players
RCD Espanyol Femenino players
Primera Federación (women) players